Richmond School for Boys was founded and built on Richmond Street as one of two new secondary schools located in Halesowen, West Midlands, England.

Richmond School for Boys and its twin Walton School for Girls were built during the 1930s as segregated 
Secondary modern  schools to serve the expanding Black Country town of Halesowen. In September 1985 Richmond Boys School along with the nearby Walton Girls School merged to form a single school for both boys and girls which was to be housed within the former Richmond School for Boys site, which was renamed, and known today as Windsor High School.

The school initially opened to pupils aged 11 upwards, before becoming a 13-18 comprehensive in September 1972 when three-tier education was introduced in Halesowen. Another reorganisation in September 1982 saw the age range altered to 11-16, with two younger year groups being added but the sixth form being closed as all of Halesowen's sixth form facilities were relocated to an expanded Halesowen College.

Expansion to the existing Richmond School buildings accommodated the now increased intake of pupils, while the former Walton School for Girls located on Highfields Lane became a second campus forming part of Halesowen College for 18 years before being demolished in 2002 to be redeveloped for housing.

Defunct schools in the Metropolitan Borough of Dudley
Boys' schools in the West Midlands (county)
Halesowen
Buildings and structures demolished in 2002
Demolished buildings and structures in England